SIMH is a free and open source, multi-platform multi-system emulator. It is maintained by Bob Supnik, a former DEC engineer and DEC vice president, and has been in development in one form or another since the 1960s.

History 
SIMH was based on a much older systems emulator called MIMIC, which was written in the late 1960s at Applied Data Research. SIMH was started in 1993 with the purpose of preserving minicomputer hardware and software that was fading into obscurity.

In May 2022, the MIT License of SIMH version 4 on GitHub was unilaterally modified by a contributor to make it non-free, by adding a clause that revokes the right to use any subsequent revisions of the software containing their contributions if modifications that "influence the behaviour of the disk access activities" are made. As of 27 May 2022, Supnik no longer endorses version 4 on his official website for SIMH due to these changes, only recognizing the "classic" version 3.x releases.

On 3 June 2022, the last revision of SIMH not subject to this clause (licensed under BSD licenses and the MIT License) was forked by the group Open SIMH, with a new governance model and steering group that includes Supnik and others. The Open SIMH group cited that a "situation" had arisen in the project that compromised its principles.

Emulated hardware 

SIMH emulates hardware from the following companies.

Advanced Computer Design 
 PDQ-3

AT&T 
 3B2

BESM 
 BESM-6

Burroughs 
 B5500

Control Data Corporation 
 CDC 1700

Data General 
 Nova
 Eclipse

Digital Equipment Corporation 
 Alpha
 PDP-1
 PDP-4
 PDP-7
 PDP-8
 PDP-9
 PDP-10
 PDP-11
 PDP-15
 VAX Family Systems
 MicroVAX I, VAXStation I
 MicroVAX II, VAXStation II
 MicroVAX 3900
 VAX 11/730
 VAX 11/750
 VAX 11/780
 VAX 8600

GRI Corporation 
 GRI-909

Hewlett-Packard 
 2116
 2100
 21MX
 3000

Honeywell 
 H316
 H516

Hobbyist projects 
 N8VEM

IBM 
 650
 701
 704
 1401
 1620
 1130
 7010
 7070
 7080
 7090/7094
 System/3

Intel 
 Intel systems 8010 and 8020

Interdata 
 16-bit series
 32-bit series

Lincoln Labs – MIT Research Lab 
 TX-0

Manchester University 
 Baby, or SSEM

MITS 
 Altair 8800 both Intel 8080 and Zilog Z80 versions

Royal-Mcbee 
 LGP-30
 LGP-21

Sage Computer Technology 
 Sage II

Scientific Data Systems 
 SDS 940

SWTPC 
 SWTPC 6800

Systems Engineering Laboratories 
 SEL-32 both Concept-32 and PowerNode systems

Xerox Data Systems 
 Sigma

References

External links 
 
 
 Additional VAX/MicroVAX models for SIMH
 Running VAX/VMS Under Linux Using SIMH
 Debian Package
 FreeBSD Port
 UNIX: Old School.  Using SIMH to explore UNIX history - Matthew Hoskins

Free emulation software
Linux emulation software
MacOS emulation software
Windows emulation software
Emulation software
Multi-emulators